The 1909-1910 season was the third season for Fenerbahçe. The club joined the Istanbul Football League in this season.

Team squad

External links
 Fenerbahçe Sports Club Official Website 

Fenerbahçe S.K. (football) seasons
Fener